Rebecca Anna Schull (née Wattenberg; born February 22, 1929) is an American stage, film and television actress, best known for her role as Fay Cochran in the NBC sitcom Wings (1990–1997).

Life and career
Schull was born in New York City, the daughter of Rachel Gutman and real estate attorney Judah Wattenberg. She was the elder sister of the late writer Ben J. Wattenberg, and is journalist Daniel Wattenberg's aunt. She was married to Gene Schull, with whom she had three children, from 1951 until his death in 2008.

Schull studied acting in the United States and in Dublin, Ireland. She may be best known as Fay Cochran, the ticket agent for a one-plane Nantucket Island airline, on the long-running 1990s NBC sitcom Wings (1990-1997).

In 1977, Schull played Fefu in the premiere of Fefu and Her Friends off-broadway. She played the nursemaid in the 1976 Broadway play Herzl. Schull also has appeared on such films and television shows as Roseanne, Law & Order, Law & Order: Criminal Intent, United 93, Frasier, My Life, Analyze This, Analyze That, Flannel Pajamas, and Little Children. From 1982–83, she played Twyla Ralston on One Life to Live, and appeared on various other soap operas. She appeared regularly on USA Network's drama Suits until 2012, when her character died; she has since made appearances in flashback scenes.

Schull was a regular cast member on the ABC Family series Chasing Life, which ran from 2014 to 2015.

In 2016, Schull played Rose on the Amazon series Crisis in Six Scenes, written and directed by Woody Allen.

In 2019, Schull starred as Claire in the movie The Last, written and directed by Jeff Lipsky.

In 2022, Schull appeared opposite Kaley Cuoco and Pete Davidson in the movie Meet Cute.

Filmography

References

External links

 

1929 births
20th-century American actresses
21st-century American actresses
Actresses from New York City
American film actresses
American television actresses
American stage actresses
Jewish American actresses
Living people
21st-century American Jews